Biku (also Romanized as Bīḵū) is a village in Jazin Rural District, in the Central District of Bajestan County, Razavi Khorasan Province, Iran. At the 2006 census, its population was 20, in 5 families.

References 

Populated places in Bajestan County